Jamui Lok Sabha constituency is one of the 40 Lok Sabha (parliamentary) constituencies in Bihar state in eastern India. This constituency again came into existence in 2008 as a part of the implementation of delimitation of parliamentary constituencies based on the recommendations of the Delimitation Commission of India constituted in 2002.

Assembly segments
Presently, Jamui Lok Sabha constituency comprises six Vidhan Sabha (legislative  assembly) segments. These are:

Members of Parliament

Election results

General elections 2019

General elections 2014

See also
 Jamui district

References

External links
Jamui lok sabha  constituency election 2019 date and schedule

Lok Sabha constituencies in Bihar
Politics of Jamui district
Politics of Munger district
Politics of Sheikhpura district